Goldin Financial Global Centre is an office building in Kowloon Bay, Hong Kong.

History
The Centre was built on a parcel that had been acquired by Goldin Group for HK$3.43 billion.

In April 2019, Mirae Asset Daewoo invested US$243 million in mezzanine debt for Goldin Financial Global Centre.

See also
 Goldin Financial Holdings Ltd.

References

External links

 

Office buildings in Hong Kong
Kowloon Bay
Kohn Pedersen Fox buildings